Arthur Cecil Gask (10 July 1869 – 25 June 1951), dentist and novelist, was born on 10 July 1869 at St Marylebone, London, fourth of five children of Charles Gask, merchant, and his wife Fanny, née Edis.

Gask, accompanied by his second wife, their two sons, and by a daughter of his first marriage, emigrated to Adelaide, South Australia in 1920, where he set up practice as a dentist. He was among the first in the city to carry out extractions with gas.

He began writing crime fiction while waiting for his patients and in 1921 paid for the publication of his first novel, The Secret of the Sandhills, which was an immediate success, which he partly attributed to generous reviews by S. Talbot Smith.

Over a period of thirty years Gask wrote over thirty books as well as contributing short stories to The Mail in Adelaide. Most of his novels described the activities of a detective, Gilbert Larose, in solving crimes. Gask's work was translated into several European languages, serialised in newspapers and broadcast on radio. He also wrote short stories.

H. G. Wells, an admirer of Gask's work, corresponded with Gask. Wells regarded The Vengeance of Larose (1939) as Gask's "best piece of story-telling...It kept me up till half-past one."

Bertrand Russell, also an admiring reader, called to see Gask at Gask's home in Walkerville, an Adelaide suburb, when he was in Adelaide in August 1950. Gask was reported to have been delighted when, within a few hours after his arrival in Adelaide, Lord Russell called in and spent about an hour and a half with him. Russell confided that he was a reader of Mr. Gask's books in England, and said that now they were so near to each other he felt he really must make his acquaintance. Lord Russell was 78 at the time and Arthur Gask was 81.

Gask's sister, Lilian Gask, was also a writer.

When nearly 80, Gask was still turning out two 80,000-words novels a year, and was reported to have got out of bed to write 23 pages and complete his final novel, Crime After Crime.

Arthur Gask died on 25 June 1951, in an Adelaide private hospital.

Bibliography

Gilbert Larose

Cloud the Smiter, 1926
The Dark Highway, 1928
The Lonely House, 1929
The Shadow of Larose, 1930
The House on the Island, 1931
Gentlemen of Crime, 1932
The Hidden Door, 1934
The Judgment of Larose, 1934
The Poisoned Goblet, 1935
The Hangman's Knot, 1936
The Master Spy, 1937
The Night of the Storm, 1937
The Grave-Digger of Monks Arden, 1938
The Fall of a Dictator, 1939
The Vengeance of Larose, 1939
The House on the Fens, 1940
The Tragedy of the Silver Moon, 1940
The Beachy Head Murder, 1941
His Prey Was Man, 1942
The Mystery of Fell Castle, 1944
The Man of Death, 1946
The Dark Mill Stream, 1947
The Unfolding Years, 1947
The House with the High Wall, 1948
The Storm Breaks, 1949
The Silent Dead, 1950
The Vaults of Blackarden Castle, 1950
Marauders by Night, 1951
Night and Fog, 1951
Crime Upon Crime, 1952 (Posthumous)

Other Novels

The Secret of the Sandhills, 1921
The Red Paste Murders (US Title: Murder in the Night), 1923
The Secret of the Garden, 1924
The Jest of Life, 1936

Short Stories

The Martyr on the Land, (1935)
The Passion Years, (1936)
The Destroyer, 1939
The Will, (1944)
Buggy's Babies, (1944)
Ghosts, (1944)
Seedtime and Harvest, (1944)
The Amazing Adventure of Marmaduke, (1944)
The Lottery Ticket, (1944)
The Mark of Honor, (1944)
The Hatton Garden Crime, (1945)
The Way of Chance, (1945)
Black Market, (1945)
The Bishop's Dilemma, (1948)

References

External links
Works by Arthur Gask at Project Gutenberg Australia

1869 births
1951 deaths
20th-century English novelists
English short story writers
Writers from London
English male short story writers
English male novelists
20th-century British short story writers
20th-century English male writers
English crime fiction writers